This is a list of investigational analgesics, or analgesics that are currently under development for clinical use but are not yet approved. Chemical/generic names are listed first, with developmental code names, synonyms, and brand names in parentheses.

Opioid receptor modulators
 Axelopran/oxycodone – combination of a centrally active μ-opioid receptor agonist and a peripherally selective μ-, κ-, and δ-opioid receptor antagonist.
 Cebranopadol (GRT-6005) – non-selective μ-opioid receptor, nociceptin receptor, and δ-opioid receptor full agonist and κ-opioid receptor partial agonist
 Desmetramadol (O-desmethyltramadol; Omnitram) – μ-opioid receptor agonist, norepinephrine reuptake inhibitor (NRI), and 5-HT2C receptor antagonist.
 Lexanopadol (GRT-6006, GRT13106G) – non-selective opioid receptor agonist
 Oxycodone/naltrexone – combination of a μ-opioid receptor agonist and a μ- and κ-opioid receptor antagonist.

Sodium channel blockers
 BIIB-095 – state-dependent and use-dependent Nav blocker, including Nav1.7.
 CC-8464 (ASP-1807) – selective Nav1.7 blocker
 Cenobamate (YKP-3089) – atypical voltage-gated sodium channel blocker.
 DSP-2230 – selective Nav1.7 and Nav1.8 blocker.
 Funapide (TV-45070, XEN402) – selective Nav1.7 and Nav1.8 blocker.
 GDC-0276 (RG-7893) – selective Nav1.7 blocker 
 GDC-0310 (RG-6029) – selective Nav1.7 blocker 
 NKTR-171 – voltage-gated sodium channel blocker 
 PF-05089771 – selective Nav1.7 and Nav1.8 blocker 
 Ralfinamide (NW-1029) – non-selective voltage-gated sodium channel blocker, as well as other actions 
 Tetrodotoxin (9401-TTX; Tectin, Tetrodin, Tocudin) – non-selective voltage-gated sodium channel blocker 
 Vixotrigine (formerly raxatrigine; CNV1014802, GSK-1014802, BIIB 074) – non-selective voltage-gated sodium channel blocker 
 VX-150 – selective Nav1.8 blocker 
 VX-548 – selective Nav1.8 blocker

Calcium channel blockers
 HSK16149 – selective ligand of α2δ subunit of voltage-gated calcium channel

channel modulators
 Capsaicin (Adlea, ALGRX-4975, CNTX-4975, VLNX-4975) – TRPV1 agonist 
 Capsaicin/diclofenac – combination of a TRPV1 agonist and a COX-2 inhibitor for topical application 
 CMX-020 – TRPV1 modulator as well as CB1 and CB2 receptor modulator 
 DWP-05195 (TR-1) – TRPV1 antagonist 
 GRC-6211 – TRPV1 agonist 
 JNJ-38893777 – TRPV1 antagonist 
Mavatrep (JNJ‐39439335) – TRPV1 antagonist.
 NEO-6860 – TRPV1 antagonist 
 Parentide (DD-04107) – TRPV1 antagonist 
 Resiniferatoxin (RTX; MCP-101) – TRPV1 agonist 
 SAR-115740 – TRPV1 antagonist 
 Tivanisiran (SYL-1001) – TRPV1 antagonist

Cannabinoid receptor modulators
 ABX-1431 – selective monoacylglycerol lipase inhibitor
 Cannabidiol (CBD) – cannabinoid receptor modulator 
 Cannabidivarin (CBDV; GWP-42006) – cannabinoid receptor modulator 
 CMX-020 – TRPV1 modulator as well as CB1 and CB2 receptor modulator 
 Dronabinol (Δ9-; ECP022A, Namisol) – CB1 and CB2 receptor agonist 
 Nabilone – CB1 and CB2 receptor agonist 
 NEO-1940 – CB1 and CB2 receptor agonist 
 Olorinab (APD-371) – CB2 receptor agonist

Nerve growth factor inhibitors
 Fasinumab (REGN-475, SAR-164877) – monoclonal antibody against nerve growth factor
 Frunevetmab (NV-02) – monoclonal antibody against nerve growth factor for cats 
 Fulranumab (AMG-403, JNJ-42160443) – monoclonal antibody against nerve growth factor 
 GBR-900 – monoclonal antibody against TrkA
 GZ-389988 – TrkA, TrkB, and TrkC kinase inhibitor
 LEVI-04 (p75NTR-Fc) – LNGF receptor (p75NTR) fusion protein and decoy receptor for nerve growth factor 
 NRD135S-E1 – tyrosine kinase modulator
 ONO-4474 – peripherally selective TrkA, TrkB, and TrkC kinase inhibitor
 Ranevetmab (NV-01) – monoclonal antibody against nerve growth factor for dogs 
 Tanezumab (PF-4383119, RI-624, RN-624) – monoclonal antibody against nerve growth factor 
 VM-902A – selective, peripherally selective allosteric inhibitor of TrkA

Others
 ALLOD-2 – undefined mechanism of action 
 CR-4056 – imidazoline I2 receptor agonist 
 E-52862 (MR-309; S1A; S1RA) – sigma-1 receptor antagonist 
 HSP-3150 – undefined mechanism of action 
 KCP-506 – nicotinic acetylcholine receptor antagonist 
 LATER – CRISPR-dCas9 gene-editing
 PAX-01 – undefined mechanism of action

See also
 List of investigational drugs

References

External links
 AdisInsight - Springer

Analgesics
Analgesics, investigational
Experimental drugs